Husein Paša Boljanić ("the Short"; died 1595) was an Ottoman statesman and government official who served many high-level positions in the Ottoman Empire, including governorship of Bosnia (1594–95), of Damascus (1582–83), of Diyarbekir, of Budin, of Aleppo, of Van, of Anatolia, and of Egypt (1573–74).

Early life
Husein was born in the village of Boljanići close to the town of Pljevlja at the time part of the Sanjak of Herzegovina (now in Montenegro). The family was one of several notable recently converted families in the Herzegovina region. His father, known as Bajram-aga, was a petty lord in his village. He had three brothers, Sinan, Ali, and Daut, and two sisters, Maksuma and Zulkada. Sinan married the sister of Grand Vizier Sokollu Mehmed Pasha and rose in the state hierarchy, becoming sanjak-bey of Bosnia in 1562.

Owing to Mehmed Pasha, who had sent him to be educated at the Enderun, Husein also rose; beginning as the subaşi of the Popovo field, he was the governor of the Sanjak of Herzegovina from March 1567 to March 1569.

He was described and nicknamed as bodur, meaning "short" in Turkish.

Career
After governoring Herzegovina, in March 1569 he became the governor (sanjak-bey) of the Sanjak of Bosnia. He then became the beylerbey of Diyarbekir in 1572. Before long, he became a vizier and was appointed the governor of Egypt Eyalet in 1573. Succeeding Koca Sinan Pasha as the governor of Egypt and only holding the office for around a year, he was described by a European source as "affectionate to men of learning, of a mild and modest disposition, and highly averse to all cruelty."; however, such qualities were anachronistic for that time, as tensions in Egypt between the governor, the sipahis of the army, and the local Mamluks were rising; the same source recounts that robberies and bandits ran abound during his term. He then returned to Istanbul in 1574.

Little is known about his life for the ten years between 1575 and 1585, but in 1585, Hüseyin Pasha was appointed the governor of Baghdad Eyalet. In 1594, he was made the beylerbey (or pasha) of the Bosnia Eyalet. After retiring within a few months, he died in 1595.

Legacy
He had the famous Husein-paša's Mosque in Pljevlja built between 1573 and 1594, which still holds the distinction of being one of the largest mosques in the region and having the highest minaret of any mosque in the Balkans, although that was a later addition after his original minaret was struck down by lightning in 1911.

See also
 Husein-paša's Mosque
 List of Ottoman governors of Egypt
 List of Ottoman governors of Damascus
 List of Ottoman governors of Bosnia

Annotations

References

Sources

External links

Ottoman governors of Egypt
Ottoman governors of Damascus
16th-century Ottoman governors of Egypt
16th-century births
1595 deaths
Year of birth missing
Ottoman governors of Baghdad
Ottoman governors of Aleppo
Ottoman governors of Bosnia
Sanjak of Herzegovina
Ottoman Bosnian nobility